An intelligent maintenance system (IMS) is a system that utilizes collected data from machinery in order to predict and prevent potential failures in them. The occurrence of failures in machinery can be costly and even catastrophic. In order to avoid failures, there needs to be a system which analyzes the behavior of the machine and provides alarms and instructions for preventive maintenance. Analyzing the behavior of the machines has become possible by means of advanced sensors, data collection systems, data storage/transfer capabilities and data analysis tools. These are the same set of tools developed for prognostics. The aggregation of data collection, storage, transformation, analysis and decision making for smart maintenance is called an intelligent maintenance system (IMS).

Definition 

An intelligent maintenance system is a system that utilizes data analysis and decision support tools to predict and prevent the potential failure of machines. The recent advancement in information technology, computers, and electronics have facilitated the design and implementation of such systems.

The key research elements of intelligent maintenance systems consist of:

 Transformation of data to information to knowledge and synchronization of the decisions with remote systems
 Intelligent, embedded prognostic algorithms for assessing degradation and predicting the performance in future
 Software and hardware platforms to run online models
 Embedded product services and life cycle information for closed-loop product designs

E-manufacturing and e-maintenance 

With evolving applications of tether-free communication technologies (e.g. Internet) e-intelligence is having a larger impact on industries. Such impact has become a driving force for companies to shift the manufacturing operations from traditional factory integration practices towards an e-factory and e-supply chain philosophy. Such change is transforming the companies from local factory automation to global business automation. The goal of e-manufacturing is, from the plant floor assets, to predict the deviation of the quality of the products and possible loss of any equipment. This brings about the predictive maintenance capability of the machines.

The major functions and objectives of e-manufacturing are: “(a) provide a transparent, seamless and automated information exchange process to enable an only handle information once (OHIO) environment; (b) improve the utilization of plant floor assets using a holistic approach combining the tools of predictive maintenance techniques; (c) links entire supply chain management (SCM) operation and asset optimization; and (d) deliver customer services using the latest predictive intelligence methods and tether-free technologies”.

The e-Maintenance infrastructure consists of several information sectors:

Control systems and production schedulers
Engineering product data management systems
Enterprise resource planning (ERP) systems
Condition monitoring systems
Maintenance scheduling (CMMS/EAM) systems
Plant asset management (PAM) systems

See also 
Big Data
Cyber manufacturing
Cyber-physical system
Decision support systems
Industrial artificial intelligence
Industrial Big Data
Industry 4.0
Internet of Things
Machine to machine
Maintenance, repair, and operations
Predictive maintenance
Preventive maintenance
Prognostics
Smart, connected products

References

Further reading 
 M. J. Ashby et al., “Intelligent maintenance advisor for turbine engines”, The Journal of the Operational Research Society, vol. 46, No. 7 (July 1995), 831-853.
 A. K. S. Jardine et al., “A review on machinery diagnostics and prognostics implementing condition-based maintenance”, Mechanical Systems and Signal Processing 20 (2006) 1483–1510.
 R. C. M. Yam et al., “Intelligent Predictive Decision Support System forCondition-Based Maintenance”, Int J Adv Manuf Technol (2001) 17:383–391
 A. Muller et al., “On the concept of e-maintenance: Review and current research”, Reliability Engineering and System Safety 93 (2008) 1165–1187
 A. Bos et al., “SCOPE: An Intelligent Maintenance System for Supporting Crew Operations”, AUTOTESTCON 2004. Proceedings. IEEE, 2004.

Maintenance
Prediction
Survival analysis